is the fourth studio album by Japanese rock band Maximum the Hormone. It was released on 31 July 2013.

Track listing

Chart positions

Album

References

Maximum the Hormone albums
2013 albums